Marian Žbontar (born March 24, 1954) is a former Yugoslav ice hockey goaltender. He played for the Yugoslavia men's national ice hockey team at the 1976 Winter Olympics in Innsbruck.

His brother, Franci Žbontar, played for the Yugoslav national ice hockey team at the 1972 and 1976 Winter Olympics.

References

1954 births
Living people
Ice hockey players at the 1976 Winter Olympics
Olympic ice hockey players of Yugoslavia
Sportspeople from Jesenice, Jesenice
Slovenian ice hockey goaltenders
Yugoslav ice hockey goaltenders